Clueless is a 1995 American comedy by Amy Heckerling and starring Alicia Silverstone.

Clueless may also refer to:

 Clueless (TV series), a television series based on the film
 Clueless (novels), a series of novels by H.B. Gilmour and Randi Reisfeld based on the film characters
 Clueless (musical)
 Clueless CD-ROM, a product by Mattel based on the Clueless franchise
 Clueless (2010 film), a Thai comedy film
 Clueless (game show), a Polish game show
 "Clueless" (House), an episode of House
 "Clue-Less", an episode of Lizzie McGuire
 "Clueless", an episode of Moloney
 "Clueless", an episode of The Oval
 "Clueless", an episode of Pregnant in Heels
 "Clue-Less", an episode of The Replacements
 "Clueless", an episode of Schooled

See also